NASCAR Unleashed is a racing video game developed by Firebrand Games and published by Activision. It was released on November 1, 2011 for PlayStation 3, Xbox 360, Wii, and Nintendo 3DS.

Features
NASCAR Unleashed is an arcade racing game, allowing players to play as 15 different drivers in NASCAR Sprint Cup racing series, and race around six locations, including Chicagoland Speedway, Daytona International Speedway, Homestead-Miami Speedway, Martinsville Speedway, Talladega Superspeedway, and a fictional track named Unleashed Speedway. Each location has multiple layouts, which accounts for 12 different track layouts.

Drivers
15 real life NASCAR drivers are featured in the game, followed by 3 fictional drivers. Each driver has one paint scheme available when one starts the game, and the more one progresses through the championships, the more bonus paint schemes one will unlock. There are 20 cars in a race for the PS3 and Xbox 360 versions, while the Wii and 3DS versions only had 12 cars in a race.

Reception

The game has received mixed reviews. Operation Sports rated it 4.5/10, praising the spin on the tracks, but criticizing the repetitiveness and lack of online multiplayer. PlayStation: The Official Magazine gave the game a 60/100 score: "It may not be a game for racing purists, but if you're looking to introduce stock car racing to a child, look no further". Game Informer gave the game a rating of 7/10, saying that "NASCAR Unleashed may be just another kart racer, but it's also not as foreign of a concept to the sport as you may think. Its drafting, rivalries, and car contact are certainly key aspects of the sport represented here – just not enough".

References

NASCAR video games
North America-exclusive video games
PlayStation 3 games
Xbox 360 games
Wii games
Nintendo 3DS games
2011 video games
Video games developed in the United Kingdom
Firebrand Games games
Multiplayer and single-player video games